The Yorkshire Post is a daily broadsheet newspaper, published in Leeds, Yorkshire, England. It primarily covers stories from Yorkshire, although its masthead carries the slogan "Yorkshire's National Newspaper". It was previously owned by Johnston Press and is now owned by JPIMedia. Founded in 1754, it is one of the oldest newspapers in the country.

Editions are available throughout the United Kingdom with offices across Yorkshire in Harrogate, Hull, Scarborough, Sheffield and York, as well as correspondents in Westminster and the City of London. The current editor is James Mitchinson. It considers itself "one of Britain's most trusted and historic newsbrands."

History

The paper was founded in 1754, as the Leeds Intelligencer, making it one of Britain's first daily newspapers. The Leeds Intelligencer was a weekly newspaper until it was purchased by a group of Conservatives in 1865 who then published daily under the current name.

The first issue of The Yorkshire Post, on 2 July 1866, included the following statement:

The newspaper broke the story of the Edward VIII abdication crisis under the editorship of Arthur Mann. In 1939, The Yorkshire Post absorbed a rival, the Leeds Mercury, which was founded in 1718 and was liberal in comparison to the Leeds Intelligencer from the late 18th century, and under the editorship of Edward Baines and his son (also named Edward Baines). At its peak in the 1950s, The Yorkshire Post sold 120,000 copies a day. This figure had dropped to 40,000 by 2012, rising to nearer 90,000 on a weekend. By the second half of 2017, it was selling less than 22,000 copies a day, and circulation further declined to just 18,534 for the period January to June 2019. As well as publishing regular supplements on sport, rural affairs, culture and motoring it runs an extensive business section with two weekly pull-out supplements.

In 2012, as its parent company Johnston Press sought to cut costs, it was merged with the Yorkshire Evening Post – the local newspaper for York - with the then editor, Peter Charlton, overseeing both titles. The merger saw the formation of combined departments for news, business, sport and features – with correspondents writing for both titles.

In February 2012 Johnston Press announced that printing of the Yorkshire Post and Yorkshire Evening Post in Leeds would be switched to their plant at Dinnington near Sheffield and the Leeds printing facility closed.

In September 2013, it was announced the Wellington Street premises would be demolished. Journalists had already vacated the building. Preliminary demolition began in March 2014, while in April 2014 it was announced the tower would be spared.

In March 2014, 'The' was reintroduced on the name of the paper after 46 years.

The Yorkshire Post achieved wider attention during the 2019 general election campaign, following the publication of a story about a boy being treated on the floor of Leeds General Infirmary which was published by sister title the Yorkshire Evening Post. The papers faced criticism on social media and in correspondence from readers, and editor James Mitchinson wrote an open letter to a reader defending the titles and their journalism.

Editors
Adapted from the official website:
 1754: Griffith Wright
 1785: Thomas Wright
 1805: Griffith Wright Jr
 1819: William Cooke Stafford
 1822: Alaric Watts
 1842: W. T. Bolland
 1848: Christopher Kemplay
 1866: John R. K. Ralph
 1882: Charles Pebody
 1890: H. J. Palmer
 1903: J. S. R. Phillips
 1920: Arthur Mann
 1939: Linton Andrews
 1961: Kenneth Young
 1964: J. Edward Crossley
 1969: John Edwards
 1989: Tony Watson
 2003: Rachael Campey
 2004: Peter Charlton
 2013: Jeremy Clifford
 2015: James Mitchinson

References

Further reading
 Merrill, John C. and Harold A. Fisher. The world's great dailies: profiles of fifty newspapers (1980) pp. 366–72

External links
British Library picture of the Leedes Intelligencer 19 May 1761

Newspapers published in Yorkshire
Mass media in Leeds
Publications established in 1754
1754 establishments in England
Daily newspapers published in the United Kingdom
Newspapers published by Johnston Press
Yorkshire Post Newspapers